Svenja Jung (born 28 May 1993 in Weroth) is a German actress.

Career
Jung completed her final school exams in 2012 and took acting lessons at the Juniorhouse in Cologne. She then performed in TV series Zwischen Kindheit und Erwachsensein by Bayerischer Rundfunk and she worked as a model. She also performed in TV commercials and short movies.

Jung is known for her role as Sonia Rossi in the feature film Fucking Berlin and the film adaption of Andreas Steinhöfel's The Center of the World where she portrayed Kat 2015. More lead roles followed. In the ZDF film Ostfriesenkiller, she portrayed the mentally disabled Sylvia Kleine. For her three leading roles, Jung was nominated for the New Faces Award 2017 as best young actress.   

Jung also studied European media science at Fachhochschule Potsdam.

Filmography

References

External links
 

1993 births
German child actresses
Living people
German film actresses
German television actresses
21st-century German actresses
People from Rhineland-Palatinate